The  New York Giants season was the franchise's 29th season in the National Football League. The Giants were looking to improve on their 7–5 record from the previous season. However, the Giants hit rock bottom in 1953, losing their first three games of the season on their way to a disappointing 3–9 record and in 5th place in their division. The season included a 62–14 loss to the Cleveland Browns, the 62 points being the most points surrendered in franchise history at the time, until it was surpassed by the 1966 team that gave up 72 points to Washington in the highest scoring game in NFL history.

Head coach Steve Owen was fired at the end of the season. After his departure, rumors emerged that future legendary coach Vince Lombardi was a candidate to replace him as the next head coach. However, the Giants ultimately settled on Jim Lee Howell as their next coach, while Lombardi was hired as co-offensive coordinator.

Schedule

Standings

New York Giants coaching vacancy
Before the end of the 1953 season, the New York Daily News had a headline in their paper that Vince Lombardi was the top candidate to become the Giants new head coach. Although Giants co-owner Wellington Mara was a classmate of Lombardi at Fordham University, the Giants were actually interested in Army head coach, Colonel Red Blaik. Blaik had declined the job, but recommended Lombardi, who was his offensive co-ordinator at Army. Despite being Red Blaik's top aide, Vince Lombardi was anxious and frustrated. Three other Army assistants, including Murray Warmath were now head coaches. In June, Lombardi had turned forty years old. Lombardi would be hired as the offensive co-ordinator for the 1954 season.

See also
List of New York Giants seasons

References

New York Giants seasons
New York Giants
1953 in sports in New York City
1950s in Manhattan
Washington Heights, Manhattan